Alexander Stanley Byrne (21 May 1904 – 23 August 1975) was an Australian rules footballer who played for the Fitzroy Football Club in the Victorian Football League (VFL).

Family
The son of John Byrne (1864 – 1955) and Phyllis Hannah Byrne, née Nattrass (1871 – 1950), Alexander Stanley Byrne was born at the western Victorian town of Nhill on 21 May 1904.

He was the older brother of both Fitzroy player Rex Byrne and Carlton and Hawthorn player Tom Byrne.

War service
Byrne later served as a gunner in an Anti Aircraft Regiment of the Australian Army during World War II.

Notes

External links 
		

1904 births
1975 deaths
Australian rules footballers from South Australia
Fitzroy Football Club players